In mathematics and theoretical physics, quasiperiodic motion is in rough terms the type of motion executed by a dynamical system containing a finite number (two or more) of incommensurable frequencies.

That is, if we imagine that the phase space is modelled by a torus T (that is, the variables are periodic like angles), the trajectory of the system is modelled by a curve on T that wraps around the torus without ever exactly coming back on itself.

A quasiperiodic function on the real line is the type of function (continuous, say) obtained from a function on T, by means of a curve

R → T

which is linear (when lifted from T to its covering Euclidean space), by composition. It is therefore oscillating, with a finite number of underlying frequencies. (NB the sense in which theta functions and the Weierstrass zeta function in complex analysis are said to have quasi-periods with respect to a period lattice is something distinct from this.)

The theory of almost periodic functions is, roughly speaking, for the same situation but allowing T to be a torus with an infinite number of dimensions.

References

See also
 Quasiperiodicity

Dynamical systems